Cardinal River is a short river in western Alberta, Canada. It flows from the Canadian Rockies, and empties into the Brazeau River, itself a major tributary of the North Saskatchewan River.

At its origin, just east of Jasper National Park, the Cardinal River forms in a basin between Tripoli, Cheviot, Prospect, Climax, and Blackface Mountains, as well as Mount Cardinal, in the Nikanassin Range. From there it flows east, through the eastern slopes of the Canadian Rockies and into the foothills. A portion of Grave Flats Road follows the river before it reaches the Bighorn Highway, where it empties into the Brazeau River south of Pembina Forks.

The Cardinal river and other surrounding landmarks are named for Jacques Cardinal, a local fur trader.  His grave is located on the banks of the river.

Tributaries
Toma Creek
Russell Creek
Nomad Creek
Ruby Creek
Ruby Lakes, Flapjack Lake, Flapjack Creek
Grave Creek
Muskiki Creek
Muskiki Lake

See also
List of Alberta rivers

References

Rivers of Alberta